Javed Akhtar (born 17 January 1945) is an Indian screenwriter, lyricist and poet. Known for his work in Hindi cinema, he has won five National Film Awards, and received the Padma Shri in 1999 and the Padma Bhushan in 2007, two of India's highest civilian honours.

Akhtar came to recognition in the duo Salim–Javed, and earned his breakthrough as a screenwriter with 1973's Zanjeer. He went on to write the films Deewar and Sholay, both released in 1975; they earned a cult following, and had a significant impact in popular culture. He later earned praise for his work as a lyricist, winning the National Film Award for Best Lyrics five times and the Filmfare Award for Best Lyricist eight times.

Akhtar notably campaigned for the Communist Party of India (CPI) and their candidate in the 2019 Indian general election, and was a member of parliament in Rajya Sabha. For his work, he received the Richard Dawkins Award in 2020.

Early life

Javed Akhtar was born in 1945 in Gwalior. His father Jan Nisar Akhtar was a Bollywood film songwriter and Urdu poet. His paternal grandfather Muztar Khairabadi was a poet as was his grandfather's elder brother, Bismil Khairabadi, while his great great grandfather, Fazl-e-Haq Khairabadi, was a religious scholar of Islam who declared the Jihad in 1857 against the English for religious reasons. Javed Akhtar's original name was Jadoo, taken from a line in a poem written by his father: "Lamha, lamha kisi jadoo ka fasana hoga". He was given the official name of Javed since it was the closest to the word jadoo. He spent most of his childhood and was schooled in Lucknow. He graduated from Saifiya College in Bhopal.

Career as scriptwriter

Initially, in the 1970s, there was generally no concept of having the same writer for the screenplay, story and dialogue, nor were the writers given any credits in the titles. Rajesh Khanna is credited with giving Salim Khan and Javed Akhtar their first chance to become screenplay writers by offering them work in Haathi Mere Saathi. Javed Akhtar stated in an interview that one day, he went to Salimsaab and said that Mr. Devar had given him a huge signing amount with which he could complete the payment for his bungalow, Aashirwad. But the film was a remake and the script of the original was far from being satisfactory. "He told us that if we could set right the script, he would make sure we got both money and credit."

Their first big success was the script for Andaz, followed by Adhikar (1971), Haathi Mere Saathi and Seeta Aur Geeta (1972). They also had hits with Yaadon Ki Baaraat (1973), Zanjeer (1973), Haath Ki Safai (1974), Deewaar (1975), Sholay (1975), Chacha Bhatija (1977), Don (1978), Trishul (1978), Dostana (1980), Kranti (1981), Zamana (1985) and Mr. India (1987). They have worked together in 24 films including two Kannada films – Premada Kanike and Raja Nanna Raja.

Of the 24 films they wrote, 20 were hits. The scripts they wrote, but which were not successful at box office include Aakhri Dao (1975), Immaan Dharam (1977), Kaala Patthar (1979) and Shaan (1980). Though they split in 1982, due to ego issues, some of the scripts they wrote were made into hit films later, such as Zamana and Mr. India. Salim-Javed, many a time described as "the most successful scriptwriters of all-time", are also noted to be the first scriptwriters in Indian cinema to achieve star status.

Personal life 

Akhtar was nominated to the Parliament upper house Rajya Sabha on 16 November 2009.
Akhtar was married to Honey Irani, with whom he had two children, Farhan Akhtar, a film actor, producer, director and Zoya Akhtar, a film writer, director and producer. The father-and-son duo have worked together in films such as Dil Chahta Hai, Lakshya, Rock On!! and Zindagi Na Milegi Dobara with Zoya. Farhan was married to Adhuna Akhtar, a hair stylist. Akhtar is an atheist, and brought up his children Farhan and Zoya Akhtar as atheists.

Akhtar married Shabana Azmi, the daughter of Urdu poet, Kaifi Azmi and later divorced Irani. Akhtar's uncle, Asrar-ul-Haq "Majaz" was also an Urdu poet. His uncle, Ansar Harvani, was a member of the Indian independence movement and an elected Member of Parliament. Akhtar's aunt, Hamida Salim, was an Indian author, economist and educator as well.

Awards and nominations
Javed was awarded the civilian honour of Padma Shri by the Government of India in 1999, followed by the Padma Bhushan in 2007. In 2013, he received the Sahitya Akademi Award in Urdu, India's second highest literary honour, for his poetry collection Lava. In 2019, he was conferred with an honorary doctorate (Doctor of Letters) by the Jamia Hamdard University. In 2020 he was awarded the Richard Dawkins Award for being a "powerful force for secularism, reason, and human rights, challenging superstition and intolerance through his work in poetry, screenwriting, and political activism".

Filmography

As screenwriter 
 Teamed as Salim-Javed

 As Javed Akhtar

Work as lyricist

 Silsila (1981)
 Duniya (1984)
 Saagar
 1942: A Love Story
 Dil Chahta Hai
 Saath-Saath
 Narsimha (1991)
 Mashaal
 Sailaab
 Mr. India
 Tezaab
 Hafta Bandh
 Jaadugar
 Joshilaay
 Arjun
 Roop Ki Rani Choron Ka Raja
 Yugandhar
 Jamai Raja
 Khel
 Gardish
 Papa Kehte Hai
 Border
 Sapnay (Dubbed version)
 Virasat
 Mrityudand
 Dastak
 Sardari Begum
 Saaz
 Mil Gayee Manzil Mujhe
 Diljale
 Yes Boss
 Darmiyaan: In Between
 Aur Pyaar Ho Gaya
 Wajood
 Kabhi Na Kabhi

 Drohi
 Jeans (Dubbed version)
 Bada Din
 Duplicate
 Laawaris
 Godmother
 Baadshah
 Arjun Pandit
 1947 Earth
 Dillagi
 Phir Bhi Dil Hai Hindustani
 Refugee
 Karobaar
 Hamara Dil Aapke Paas Hai
 Raja Ko Rani Se Pyar Ho Gaya
 Champion
 Gang
 Pyar Ki Dhun
 Zubeidaa
 Lagaan
 Abhay
 Moksha
 Agni Varsha
 Mere Yaar Ki Shaadi Hai
 Badhaai Ho Badhaai
 Yeh Kya Ho Raha Hai?
 Satta
 Love at Times Square
 The Hero: Love Story of a Spy
 Armaan
 Chalte Chalte
 Kuch Naa Kaho
 Kal Ho Naa Ho
 L.O.C. Kargil

 Tehzeeb
 Main Hoon Na (2004)
 Veer-Zaara (2004)
 Lakshya
 Charas
 Kyun! Ho Gaya Na...
 Dobara
 Swades
 Kisna: The Warrior Poet
 Bose: The Forgotten Hero
 Mangal Pandey: The Rising
 Dil Jo Bhi Kahey...
 Kabhi Alvida Naa Kehna
 Don: The Chase Begins Again
 Namastey London
 Ta Ra Rum Pum
 Dhan Dhana Dhan Goal
 Welcome
 Om Shanti Om
 Jodhaa Akbar
 Rock On!!
 Luck by Chance (2009)
 What's Your Raashee? (2009)
 Wake Up Sid (2009)
 Karthik Calling Karthik (2010)
 Khelein Hum Jee Jaan Sey (2010)
 Aisha (2010)
 Red Alert: The War Within (2010)
 Prem Kaa Game (2010)
 Don 2: The King is Back (2011)
 Traffic Signal (2009)
 Ekk Deewana Tha (2012)
 Talaash (2012)
 Vishwaroop (2013)
 Mohenjo Daro (2016)
 Raees (2017)
 Dil Dhadakne Do (2015)
Rock On 2
Paltan (2018)
Namastey England (2018)
Gully Boy (2019)
Panga(2020)

Bibliography
 Tarkash (1995) 
 Lava (2012)

See also

 List of Urdu-language poets

References

Further reading

External links

 Javed Akhtar Songs, Poetry, Biography
 Javed Akhtar at Kavita Kosh  (Hindi)
 
 BBC's Noel Thompson interviews JavedAkhtar on 4 September 2006

Indian male poets
Former Muslims
Recipients of the Padma Shri in arts
Urdu-language poets from India
Aligarh Muslim University alumni
Recipients of the Padma Bhushan in literature & education
Filmfare Awards winners
Filmfare Lifetime Achievement Award winners
Indian atheists
Indian lyricists
People from Aligarh
Writers from Bhopal
People from Gwalior
Writers from Lucknow
Former Muslims turned agnostics or atheists
1945 births
Living people
Nominated members of the Rajya Sabha
Poets from Uttar Pradesh
20th-century Indian poets
21st-century Indian poets
Urdu-language writers

20th-century Indian male writers
21st-century Indian male writers
Screenwriters from Uttar Pradesh
20th-century Indian dramatists and playwrights
21st-century Indian dramatists and playwrights
Best Lyrics National Film Award winners
20th-century atheists
21st-century atheists

Recipients of the Sahitya Akademi Award in Urdu